The Crestar Classic was a golf tournament on the Champions Tour from 1983 to 1990. It was played in Manakin-Sabot, Virginia at the Hermitage Country Club.  In 1988, it was the last professional victory for golf legend Arnold Palmer.

The purse for the 1990 tournament was US$350,000, with $52,500 going to the winner. The tournament was founded in 1983 as the United Virginia Bank Seniors.

Winners
Crestar Classic
1990 Jim Dent
1989 Chi-Chi Rodríguez
1988 Arnold Palmer
1987 Larry Mowry

United Virginia Bank Seniors
1986 Chi-Chi Rodríguez
1985 Peter Thomson
1984 Dan Sikes
1983 Miller Barber

Source:

References

Former PGA Tour Champions events
Golf in Virginia
Sports in Richmond, Virginia
1983 establishments in Virginia
1990 disestablishments in Virginia
Recurring sporting events established in 1983
Recurring sporting events disestablished in 1990